The Houston Force were an American soccer club. In 1994, the club was originally called the Puerto Rico Islanders, but were forced to move by FIFA before playing any games. They instead played in Houston, Texas, where the Force only played one game before folding.

The team had only three players with any significant professional experience, David Vaudreuil, Chris Charles and Eloy Salgado.  Vaudreuil and Charles had both played with the Tampa Bay Rowdies in 1993 and Salgado had played in MISL. The team hired experienced manager Hernan "Chico" Borja as head coach.

The Force played the Los Angeles Salsa on July 14, 1994, in Houston's Joe Kelly Butler Stadium. The Salsa handled the Force easily, winning 3-0, in front of an official attendance of 1,400 fans (estimated to be lower). Seven days later, the APSL executive board revoked the team's league membership based on financial issues.

Year-by-year

Managers
1994: Chico Borja

References

Defunct soccer clubs in Texas
Force
USISL teams
Soccer clubs in Texas
Puerto Rico Islanders
1994 establishments in Texas
1994 disestablishments in Texas
Association football clubs established in 1994
Association football clubs disestablished in 1994